Kabir Sehgal is an American author, composer, producer, navy officer, military veteran, investment banker, and financial executive. He is the New York Times and Wall Street Journal bestselling author of twelve books. He has also won five Grammy Awards and three Latin Grammy Awards as a record producer. He was previously a vice president at JPMorgan Chase and worked at First Data Corporation.

Education
Sehgal was born in Atlanta, Georgia and attended The Lovett School. He attended Dartmouth College and was a staff columnist for the university newspaper The Dartmouth, bassist for the university jazz band, and a member of Sigma Alpha Epsilon.
He completed his postgraduate degree with distinction from the London School of Economics as a Reynolds Scholar.

Career
Kabir Sehgal is the Founder & CEO of Tiger Turn Productions, a multimedia production firm specializing in music, film, and multi-media projects.

He worked in corporate strategy at First Data Corporation, a global payments firm, which completed the largest initial public offering on the New York Stock Exchange in 2015. Previously, Sehgal was a vice president at J.P. Morgan in the emerging markets equities group, where he helped place the Alibaba initial public offering, the largest in history. He began his career by starting an online education company in India with a friend, but it failed.

Literary career
His first book, Jazzocracy: Jazz, Democracy, and the Creation of a New American Mythology was published in 2008 by Better World Books. Jazzocracy explores the relationship between jazz music and the concept of democracy. He drew upon his experiences serving on the John Kerry presidential campaign and touring with Grammy-winner Wynton Marsalis. The book was later the inspiration for a university course at Baruch College. The book later served as the basis for a TED Talk.

In May 2010, Sehgal's Walk in My Shoes: Conversations between a Civil Rights Legend and his Godson on the Journey Ahead was published by Palgrave Macmillan. The book is co-written by former Mayor of Atlanta Andrew Young, his godfather, who offers his thoughts on leadership, civil rights, love and faith, among other topics. President Bill Clinton wrote the foreword to the book.

Sehgal's book A Bucket of Blessings was published by Simon & Schuster on April 29, 2014, and reached the New York Times best sellers list. A children's book, it chronicles the story of Monkey, a character who tries to bring water to his village at a time of drought, but fails when water leaks out of the bottom of his bucket on his journey. The foreword to the book was written by Maya Angelou. The book was adapted for a stage production at the Alliance Theatre, which ran from January to February 2016.

His book, Coined: The Rich Life of Money and How Its History Has Shaped Us, was published on March 10, 2015, and was one of Business Insider's top 15 business books coming out in 2015. It examines how and why money has come to play such a central role in everyday life. Topics such as the neuroscience of money behavior and the archaeology of coinage are also examined from and anthropological and historical perspective. With regard to digital currencies such as Bitcoin, Seghal writes in Coined that it is unlikely they will gain traction as an alternative to the U.S. dollar given U.S. government's power to determine what is a currency.

In March 2015, Coined became a New York Times and Wall Street Journal best seller. The New York Times said of Coined, "If you've been waiting for an economic version of 'Eat, Pray, Love,' this may be it." The Financial Times called Coined, "An eclectic and sometimes personal inquiry into the roots of finance takes in everything from Galápagos turtles to Apple Pay."

His children's book The Wheels on the Tuk Tuk was published by Simon & Schuster in January 2016. Publishers Weekly described the book as, "a wonderfully accessible introduction to daily life in another place."

Kabir Sehgal wrote a book of poetry with Deepak Chopra, Home: Where Everyone is Welcome, which was published by Grand Central Publishing in August 2017. The book is composed of 34 poems inspired various American immigrants such as Albert Einstein and Madeleine Albright. The book became a Publishers Weekly bestseller.

Sehgal's book Fandango at the Wall was published by Grand Central Publishing in October 2018. It describes the Mexican traditions of fandango and son jarocho music. It comes with a music CD that combines Afro Latin Jazz and son jarocho music. It also details the history of the relationship between the United States and Mexico. The foreword to the book is written by Douglas Brinkley and the afterword is by Andrew Young. The book was nominated for an Audie Award for Best Original work in 2019.

Simon & Schuster published Sehgal's children's book Festival of Colors, which is about Holi, the Indian festival of colors in January 2018. It was named a Favorite Picture Book of the Year by Barnes & Noble and book all young Georgians should read in 2018 by Georgia Center for the Book. Simon & Schuster published Sehgal's children's book Thread of Love, which is about the Indian tradition of raksha bandhan, in October 2018. It was named a Best Children's Book of 2018, according to the Seattle Public Library.

Sehgal co-wrote Legion of Peace: Twenty Paths to Super Happiness with Muhammad Yunus, the Nobel Peace Prize Recipient in 2006, Monica Yunus, and Camille Zamora. Hachette published the book in December 2018.

Sehgal's children's book P is For Poppadoms! was published by Simon and Schuster in November 2019. It is an Indian alphabet book.

Sehgal, with his father R.K. Sehgal, co-wrote the book Close the Loop: The Life of an American Dream CEO and His Five Lessons for Success, published in May 2020 by Hachette. It is a biography of Sehgal's father talking about his journey as an Indian immigrant, coming to the United States and working his way to become a businessman and government official.

Sehgal's writings have appeared in The New York Times, Fortune, Foreign Policy, Harvard Business Review, MarketWatch, Newsweek, The Nation, New York Observer, Quartz, Zero Hedge, Atlanta Journal-Constitution, Atlanta Business Chronicle, CNBC, Reader's Digest, entrepreneur, Inc. and The Street and has appeared on CNN, PBS, NPR, Bloomberg, Fox News, CNBC, C-SPAN, Cheddar TV, National Geographic Channel and Fusion. He co-founded the journal of information systems at the London School of Economics.

Music career
Sehgal is a jazz bassist, composer, and Grammy Award-winning producer. He has produced albums for Deepak Chopra, Chucho Valdés, Arturo O'Farrill, Ted Nash, Carlos Barbosa-Lima, Gabriel Alegria, Ben Allison, Pablo Ziegler, John Daversa, Lori Henriques, Paul Avgerinos, Pedro Giraudo, Manuel Valera, Emilio Solla, and Gregorio Uribe. He has won five Grammys and three Latin Grammys as a producer. His productions have received twenty-one nominations and thirteen awards.

He was the executive producer, producer, and liner notes author for The Offense of the Drum by Arturo O'Farrill and the Afro Latin Jazz Orchestra. The album won the Grammy Award for the Best Latin Jazz Album and the 2015 Cubadisco for Best International Album. It was also nominated for a Latin Grammy for Best Latin Jazz Album.

In December 2014, Sehgal and O'Farrill led a delegation to Havana to record Cuba: The Conversation Continues. The album was released in August 2015, with Sehgal serving as executive producer, liner notes author, and artistic producer. The New York Times said that it was "an album worthy of its moment, an ambitious statement that honors deeply held musical traditions while pushing forward." The album was voted Best Latin Jazz Album of the year by an NPR critics' poll and was nominated for the Grammy for Best Large Jazz Ensemble Album. "The Afro Latin Jazz Suite" won the Grammy for Best Instrumental Composition. Cuba: The Conversation Continues won the Latin Grammy for Best Latin Jazz Album.

Sehgal served as executive producer and artistic producer of Presidential Suite: Eight Variations on Freedom by the Ted Nash Big Band. The album features several notable figures, such as Andrew Young, Glenn Close, and Sam Waterston reading speeches by former presidents. Sehgal wrote the liner notes with Douglas Brinkley. The album won the Grammy Award for Best Large Jazz Ensemble Album. JazzTimes said that during his acceptance speech, "Sehgal gracefully pushed back against the current administration." "While one president says, 'Build a wall,' " Sehgal said, "another said, 'Tear this wall down.'" In addition, a selection on the album "Spoken at Midnight" won the Grammy for Best Instrumental Composition.

Sehgal served as the executive and artistic producer of Familia: Tribute to Bebo & Chico by Arturo O'Farrill & Chucho Valdés. He authored the liner notes and wrote a composition "Raja Ram" which features Grammy nominated sitarist Anoushka Shankar. In 2017, a selection from the album "Three Revolutions" won a Grammy in Best Instrumental Composition.

Sehgal served as the producer and liner notes author of Jazz Tango by Pablo Ziegler Trio, which won a Grammy for Best Latin Jazz Album in 2017. He also served as the producer and liner notes author for Vigor Tanguero by Pedro Giraudo, which won the Latin Grammy for Best Tango Album in 2018.

Sehgal served as the producer of Legion of Peace: Songs Inspired by Nobel Peace Laureates by Lori Henriques Quintet featuring Joey Alexander with Muhammad Yunus. The album was released on the International Day of Peace, September 21, 2018. He also played the bass on the album. Each song is about a different Nobel Peace Laureate such as Malala Yousafzai and Desmond Tutu.

Sehgal served as the executive producer of Fandango at the Wall by Arturo O’Farrill and the Afro Latin Jazz Orchestra which was released in September 2018 by Resilience Music Alliance. Sehgal also composed a piece on the two-disc album, and he played the bass and Leona. Sehgal led a delegation of musicians to the border wall between San Diego and Tijuana to record musicians on both sides of the wall.  The project was inspired by the Fandango Fronterizo festival in which son jarocho musicians perform a fandango on both sides of the border. Special guests featured on the album include Regina Carter, Antonio Sanchez, Ana Tijoux, Mandy Gonzalez, Akua Dixon, the Villalobos Brothers, and Rahim AlHaj. It also features son jarocho musicians such as Patricio Hidalgo, Fernando Guadarrama, Tacho Utrera, and Ramon Gutierrez. The album was called "The Most Valuable Music of 2018" by The Nation.  The song "Line in the Sand" on the album was released in partnership with UNICEF.   

Sehgal served as a producer of American Dreamers: Voices of Hope, Music of Freedom by John Daversa Big Band Featuring 53 DACA recipients, which was released in September 2018. Sehgal also played bass and wrote the liner notes. The project was endorsed by Speaker of the House Nancy Pelosi, Senators Kamala Harris. The project won 3 Grammy Awards: Best Large Jazz Ensemble Album; Best Arrangement, Instrumental or A Capella; and Best Improvised Jazz Solo.

Selections of Sehgal's opera "Angela Ring" were performed at Carnegie Hall.

Film career
A short of the film "Music Without Borders" was selected as a finalist for the Migrant Voice Film Challenge.

Philanthropy
In 2006, Sehgal co-founded Music for Tomorrow (MFT), a non-profit organization that initially raised money to help musicians return to New Orleans after Hurricane Katrina. Eventually, the organization became an online band booking service that people used to book jazz musicians in various cities across America while generating voluntary "tips" to help New Orleans-based charities. In 2014, MFT merged with the Afro Latin Jazz Alliance.

He serves on the advisory board of the NYU Stern Center for Business and Human Rights. He is a member of the Council on Foreign Relations. He is a French-American Foundation Young Leader and was named a Young Global Leader by the World Economic Forum in 2020.

Military service
Sehgal is an officer in the U.S. Navy Reserve. He served on active duty with special operations in the Middle East and received a Defense Meritorious Service Medal.

Personal life
Sehgal is the grandson of Piara Singh Gill, an Indian Nuclear scientist; and the son of R.K.Sehgal, a businessman and public official in the state of Georgia. He is godson of Andrew Young, who served as an advisor to Martin Luther King Jr., and was a U.S. ambassador to the United Nations.

Bibliography
2008 Jazzocracy: Jazz, Democracy, and the Creation of a New American Mythology
2010 Walk in My Shoes: Conversations between a Civil Rights Legend and his Godson on the Journey Ahead
2014 A Bucket of Blessings
2015 Coined: The Rich Life of Money and How Its History Has Shaped Us
2016 The Wheels on the Tuk Tuk
2017 Home: Where Everyone Is Welcome 
2018 Festival of Colors
2018 Thread of Love
2018 Fandango at the Wall
2018 Legion of Peace
2019 P is for Poppadoms

Selected discography

With Arturo O'Farill & the Afro Latin Jazz Orchestra
 2011: 40 Acres and a Burro (Associate Producer)
 2014: The Offense of the Drum (Executive Producer, producer, Liner Notes)
 2015: Cuba: The Conversation Continues (Executive Producer, Producer, Liner Notes)
 2017: Familia: Tribute to Bebo & Chico (Executive Producer, Producer, Liner Notes, Composer) 
 2018: Fandango at the Wall  (Executive Producer, producer, Liner Notes, composer, Bass, Leona, Vocals)
 2020: Four Questions (Executive Producer, producer, Liner Notes)

With others
 2015: 10 – Gabriel Alegria Afro-Peruvian Sextet (Producer)
 2015: Cumbia Universal – Gregorio Uribe (Producer, Associate Producer, Liner Notes)
 2016: Presidential Suite: Eight Variations on Freedom – Ted Nash (Executive Producer, producer, Liner Notes)
 2016: Native Land – Gwen Hughes (Producer)
 2016: Runaway Train – Joe Mulholland Trio (Executive Producer, Producer)
 2016: Shanti Samsara – Ricky Kej (Producer, Liner Notes)
 2016: Tributango – Emilio Solla (Executive Producer, Producer) 
 2016: Carlos Barbosa-Lima Plays Mason Williams – Carlos Barbosa-Lima (Producer)
 2017: Home: Where Everyone Is Welcome (Artist, Producer, Liner Notes, Bass, Composer)    
 2017: Jazz Tango – Pablo Ziegler (Producer, Liner Notes)
 2017: Layers of the City – Ben Allison (Executive Producer)
 2017: Maple Leaf Rag – Chris Washburne (Producer, Liner Notes)
 2017: Rediscovered Ellington – Dial & Oatts, Rich DeRosa, The WDR Big Band (Producer, Liner Notes)
 2018: Mortality Mansions – Herschel Garfein & Donald Hall (Producer)
 2018: Argentina vs. Uruguay – Gustavo Casenave & Dario Boente (Executive Producer, producer, Liner Notes) 
 2018: Vigor Tanguero – Pedro Giraudo (Producer, Liner Notes)   
 2018: An Argentinian in New York – Pedro Giraudo (Producer, Liner Notes)   
 2018: China Caribe – Dongfeng Liu (Producer, Liner Notes)   
 2018: American Dreamers – John Daversa Big Band Featuring DACA Artists (Executive Producer, producer, Liner Notes, Bass, Composer)  
 2018: Legion of Peace – Lori Henriques Quartet featuring Joey Alexander (Executive Producer, producer, Bass, Liner Notes)
 2018: The Planets – Manuel Valera Trio (Producer, Liner Notes)
 2018: Mindfulness – Paul Avgerinos (Producer)
 2019: Meditations on the Seven Spiritual Laws of Success – Deepak Chopra, Paul Avgerinos, Kabir Sehgal (Artist, Producer)
 2019: Crossing Borders – Richie Beirach, Gregor Huebner, WDR Big Band (Producer, Liner Notes)
 2019: El Violin Latino, Vol. 3: Los Soñadores – Gregor Hueber (Producer, Liner Notes)
 2019: Hiding Out – Mike Holober & Gotham Jazz Orchestra (Producer, Liner Notes)
 2020: Spiritual Warrior – Deepak Chopra, Paul Avgerinos, Kabir Sehgal (Executive Producer, producer, Artist)
 2020: Swing States – Regina Carter (Executive Producer, producer, Liner Notes, Bass, Percussion)

References

External links
Official Website
 Edge of the South at TED.com

Writers from Atlanta
Dartmouth College alumni
The Lovett School alumni